Global advertising or international advertising consists of collecting, processing, analyzing and interpreting information. There are two main purposes of international advertising research: (1) to assist business executives to make profitable international advertising decisions for their specific products and services and (2) to contribute to general knowledge of international advertising that is potentially useful to a variety of business executives, educators, government policy makers, advertising self-regulatory organizations and others interested in understanding the process and effects international advertising.

Beginnings/makings  
In the first 30 years of the 1900s, especially in the prosperous 1920's, increasing numbers of European and US manufactures sold branded consumers or industrial products outside their home countries. Some of them utilized ”export advertising agencies". Most such agencies depended primarily on foreign agencies (called affiliate,associate,or correspondent agencies)either to modify domestic campaigns or to initiate entirely new campaigns, whichever was appropriate from their clients’ point of view. Export agencies and their foreign affiliates serving international industrial (now called business-to-business) advertisers tended to translate and adapt domestic advertising materials for use abroad. Agencies serving international advertisers of consumer products tended to depend somewhat more on foreign correspondent agencies to develop localized advertising campaigns appropriate for their particular markets.

Between 1930  and the mid-1950s the number of export or international advertising agencies declined. In 1958 in the USA six full-service advertising agencies and a handful of export/international advertising agencies were capable of providing international services for their US clients.These six accounted for more than 90% of all international billings of US agencies. Into the 1960s most exporters and manufactures with foreign subsidiaries necessarily continued to utilize local foreign advertising agency services available in the countries in which they did business.In the 1970s and 1980s many consolidations and mergers led to the emergence of large international media buying organizations and large holding companies consisting of groups of international advertising agencies. From the 1980s onward, advertising practices within domestic advertising agencies in Europe and the USA continued to improve.

Global Advertising strategy  
Coca-Cola is one of the most influential brands in the world! His personal journey highlights a unique advertising strategy. The Coca-Cola brand has become an ultimate symbol of globalization in the 20th century. Concerning his image, his strategy is simple. In every country of the world, we find the same colors, the same graphics, the same packaging.

In order to remain on the world market, the brand adopts a strong communication positioning. Coca-Cola's slogans have evolved a lot. From 1922 until the beginning of World War II, Coca-Cola's goal was to play on the "refreshing" side of the drink, to make people want to consume. Thus, from 1922 to 1938, the slogans were centered on this sentiment. During the Second World War, Coca-Cola adopted a family-oriented discourse. The goal is to meet with a family around a Coca-Cola.

After the Second World War, Coca-Cola returns to the simple values of its product: refreshment.

In 1979, the first notion of happiness is evoked in their slogan and then in 2009, the brand will unveil its most popular slogan "Open Happiness". The drink becomes the reference soda that gives the smile between friends and family.

The brand multiplies the communication operations revolving around this universe. With its latest international campaign to give bottles a name, Coca proves to the world that it is capable of deploying such a campaign and creating a global fascination with its brand. A strategy that is more than profitable because it has an impact on the packaging itself, which forces the consumer to obtain the product.

In 1982, the brand created the Coca-Cola Light. Consequently, many variations appear and show a true strategy of diversification of the product. With so many types of products, the brand is able to satisfy all types of customers. The Coca Light is especially aimed at women aged 15–35, so much so that the Coca Zero is more intended for men with its darker colors. Other variations, such as Coca-Cola Cherry or Vanilla make it possible to seduce with other tastes.

During the holiday season, Coca-Cola uses father Noel redesigned with the colors of the brand. Its goal is to attract new consumers, children. Santa Claus will be a great help to popularize the drink with young people, especially when one knows that a mascot helps greatly to attract the sympathy of the children. In addition, Santa will also allow the brand to continue communicating even in winter while refresh values are not credible during this season.

Coca-Cola is a big fan of street-marketing. With the arrival of Internet, street-marketing clearly took another dimension with the brands. Indeed, the fact of carrying out a direct marketing operation will certainly make it possible to touch the people who are "victims", but also to viralize the content easily and to a lesser extent on the internet. Coca-Cola is a very big fan of the viral operation. The aim of this type of communication is mainly to retain young people, who will be the first to be affected by the viralization of the operation.

Representative brands of China companies and their development status 
Alibaba is a famous company in the world now, especially unlike the disastrous 2012 Facebook (FB,Tech30) IPO on Nasdaq, Alibaba went smoothly on the New York Stock Exchange. Since IPO, Alibaba described the latest business development and strategic objectives to more than 200 global institutional investors and analysts by Jack Ma and all executives. Alibaba group set itself the longterm strategic goals of serving global 10 million profit businesses and 20 million consumers confirmed globalization, rural, big data and cloud computing these three strategies. And thus the formation of electricity providers, finance, logistics, cloud computing, globalization, networking and consumer media seven core business segments. At the same time, also pictures, health, sports, music and other aspects of the layout.

Alibaba claimed that international is not equal in foreign business and factories, is not how much money, but to have international ideas and strategies. Some Chinese enterprises have an international facility, but does not mean they are international, some companies do not have to open a company in a foreign country, it does not mean they are not international. Over the past years Alibaba has accumulated some experience, but also want to accumulate some more experience to Chinese enterprises, so that they are used to dealing with business and the world.

About fake goods and copycat products, Alibaba has its own point of view. Global brands have long been dependent on China and other low-cost manufacturing markets to boost their profit margins. China has the world’s largest OEM, but has been the lack of electricity providers such shipping channels. Genuine and fake goods production may be the same plant, their products are not any better than genuine difference, but there is a better price. Brand aspects of intellectual property rights is not a problem, they face a new business model problem.

Advertising in Europe 
European consumers are less confident about advertising and brand communication. Several studies show :

• Earned media, as customer recommendations, editorial content and brand content, is more effective than paid advertising,

• Confidence in traditional advertising declines,

• Trust in online and mobile advertising believes that it remains very low,

• There is a strong regional disparity

• Advertising targeting still has a long way to go.

Beyond these very findings in favor of Inbound Marketing - customers come to the company rather than the company come to them as in the traditional methods of Outbound Marketing.

European consumers are particularly skeptical of all forms of communication with the lowest score for each mode of communication compared to other geographical areas. Europeans are therefore less eager to consume than other inhabitants of the planet and much more reluctant to advertise. Marketing and communication agencies must take into account the recommendations they make to clients: more and more Inbound Marketing, but also a more objective and measured communication where consumer interest is at the center of our concerns and the strings of communication.

Common characteristics and cultural differences

Product or Service Offering 
In global marketing, a company offers the same products and services across the board, in multiple countries. Think about banks, insurance companies and large retail chains like Wal-Mart.

In international marketing, products and services are tailored to specific countries. Think about Sharia finance products, which are only offered in Islamic countries or to Muslim customers in non-Muslim countries – or meat that is banned from Israeli or Muslim diet.

Marketing Staff 
Global marketing personnel tend to work at the company’s headquarters and generally are a diverse group of people. They possess various skills that collectively mesh well together, and take a global view of the company’s market.

Conversely, in international marketing, team members tend to hail exclusively from the same country or a country with linguistic or cultural affinity with the primary country.

Marketing Budget 
The budget of a global marketing team is managed directly from the corporate headquarters. For example, Nike sets a global marketing budget, which then trickles down to local offices.

In international marketing, however, budget issues are negotiated and handled at the local level, within the subsidiary. Take for example McDonald, which runs local ads, some of which you will never see in another country.

Promotion Tactics 
When it comes to promotion tactics, global marketing teams try to run ads and other communication ploys that are in sync with a global audience.

An excellent way to understand is to see ads that were run during the 2014 FIFA World Cup – a perfect mix for global marketing: global sports event, billions of viewers, one passion for the game.

In international marketing, commercials and other promotion tactics are tailored for the local market.

Operational Autonomy 
Marketing does not mean you sit in a corner office and think about how to sell a product. The typical marketing mix has four components, what experts call the 4Ps: product, price, promotion and place (of distribution).

So in terms of operational autonomy, global marketing teams tend to run everything from A to Z, from the corporate headquarters, whereas international marketing teams handle things domestically.

Social media 
By reviewing their social media pages, you can quickly see which companies favor global marketing over international marketing – and vice versa. For example, you will notice that McDonald adopts an international marketing strategy, with Facebook pages as diverse as McDonald’s Malaysia, McDonald’s Brazil, McDonald’s Italia and McDonald’s Polska (Poland).

Conversely, Nike or Caterpillar runs a single page.

Customer Engagement 
Customer engagement is more active in international marketing. By setting multiple communication channels, a company can better engage with fans and customers at a local level.

That is not to say that global marketing is less effective when it comes to customer engagement – the tactics are just different.

But it is clear that international marketing tends to produce a higher level of engagement than global marketing.

Advertising 
In global marketing, commercials are run all over the world, whereas international marketing favors ad airing in the local market exclusively – or in similar markets, at most.

Some products lend themselves pretty well to global advertising. We already talked about sport gear; you also have movies and songs as well as technology products.

Other products, conversely, cannot exist in some countries because of cultural prohibition or legal censorship.

Market Research and R&D 
Market research and R&D are as deep and broad in global marketing as they are in international marketing.

Sometimes, though, global marketing can produce big flops when market research has not properly conducted or local customs thoroughly studied. Think, for example, of Chevy Nova’s and Mazda LaPuta’s unfortunate stints in the Spanish market (in Spanish, ‘no va’ and ‘la puta’ mean ‘it doesn’t go’ and ‘the whore,’ respectively.).

Other product flops include the Ben-Gay aspirin, McDonald’s Arch Deluxe, and the Cocaine Energy Drink produced by Redux Beverages.

Hybrid Structure 
Our number 10 example is not really an example of comparative global marketing vs. international marketing analysis, but an illustration of how a hybrid structure – international and global – can help companies succeed.

Coca-Cola used that mixed tactic effectively in the earlier days, and is nowadays followed by every company, from Mercedes Benz to Frito Lay to Procter & Gamble to McDonald's.

Every culture could benefit from Nike, since shoes are a benefit to everyone with feet (which is virtually everyone). The same is true of Caterpillar, since industrial machinery helps to advance mankind in general through more efficient construction. On the other hand, if it is a product that only serves one sub-set of people, or otherwise excludes certain subsets, then an "international marketing" approach is necessary. Companies with risqué or culturally insensitive products can't use the same approach everywhere. For example, alcohol and lingerie companies wouldn't have much fortune in many middle eastern companies where drinking and dressing inappropriately are not widely viewed as acceptable. Cigarette companies would need to modify their message for more socially conscious populations. In these scenarios, international marketing would work better and either no marketing, or specifically tailored marketing would be of greater benefit.

The influence of the internet 
The digital culture creates new codes that must be understood in order to be able to use them effectively.

We know that in the past, the professional rhythm was dictated by the seasons, that the basic needs were to sleep, drink and eat. Today they remain the same, we want to love and be loved, create and feel useful, give meaning. The digital has not changed our needs, it is the means that allow them to satisfy them by avoiding the constraints that evolved. Like any revolution, the era of digital revolution has disrupted culture, as Gutenberg's printing press has allowed the mass distribution of information.

At the moment, everything is faster, access to the media, culture, applications, social networks, trends, information... Everything is accessible, just a click and curiosity takes precedence. Digital techniques reserve us experiences from everyday life. One can travel in space, anywhere in the world through Google Maps, sometimes even inside some buildings. You can make videoconferences at the other end of the earth, create material using 3D or use Augmented Reality to try out the fighter plane. Everything becomes possible and within everyone's reach. And that, brands take it into account in their strategy.

The relationship with the other has evolved, a digital identity specific to each one is born of the digital, the encounters are reversed, the quality of the links different, one broadens his personal network. From the point of view of the brand, understanding consumer behavior on the Internet is paramount when it affects its real life. Virtual products flourish, dematerialized purchases take the place and production relocates. Digital affects economy as such.

The organization of the structures is modified, we want to tell and create more stories. We are witnessing the birth of a network model. Five years ago, it was still non-existent, it is to say the speed at which the digital evolves with its time.

Before digital, communication was a one-way tool. The brand sent a message to the consumer and there was no return, no interaction and exchange. Digital has distorted this practice, it has created new specialized trades like Community Management which is capital for a brand.

The speed of information has increased, we are witnessing an amplification of it, a decontextualization at times. The power of algorithms influences automation, holding information is good, what one needs to be more thoughtful. The place of the consumer is different on the Internet but it remains at the center of the strategy.

References 

Advertising